Ahmadiyeh may refer to:
 Ahmadiyeh, Hamadan
 Ahmadiyeh, Fahraj, Kerman Province
 Ahmadiyeh, Rafsanjan, Kerman Province
 Ahmadiyeh, Khuzestan
 Ahmadiyeh, Razavi Khorasan
 Ahmadiyeh, South Khorasan

See also
 Ahmadiyya (disambiguation)